This is a comprehensive discography of the record label Facedown Records and its imprints Strike First Records and Dreamt Music.

1990s

2000s

2010s

2020s

References

Discographies of American record labels